50/50 is a 2016 documentary film by Tiffany Shlain on "the 10,000 year history of women and power"  The film addresses the lack of equal representation in politics.  The film premiered on #TEDWomen and at TEDx.

Over 10,000 screenings of were scheduled for 10 May 2017, which was termed "50/50 Day."

References

External links
First-Ever "50/50 Day" Challenges Us All To Make 100% Commitment To Gender Equality, bizjournals.com
50/50 By 2020: Gender Equality On Display At Cannes Film Festival, variety411.com

Documentary films about women
2016 films
Documentary films about politics
Women in politics
American documentary films
2010s American films